Elijah Brigham Stoddard (June 5, 1826 – September 27, 1903) was an attorney and politician who served in both branches of the Massachusetts legislature, as a member of the Massachusetts Executive Council and as the mayor of Worcester, Massachusetts.

Early life
Stoddard was born to Elijah and Zilpah (Nelson) Stoddard in Upton, Massachusetts on June 5, 1826.

Family life
On January 16, 1852, Stoddard married Mary E. Davis of Worcester.

Massachusetts state government service

Massachusetts House of Representatives
Stoddard was a member of the Massachusetts House of Representatives in 1856.

District Attorney of Worcester County, Massachusetts
Stoddard was appointed the District Attorney of Worcester County, Massachusetts to fill the vacancy caused by the death of John H. Matthews. Stoddard filled out the rest Mathews term but he did not seek election to another term.

Massachusetts Senate
From 1864 to 1865, Stoddard was a member of the Massachusetts Senate.

He was elected a member of the American Antiquarian Society in 1865.

Massachusetts Executive Council
From 1871 to 1872  Stoddard was a member of the Massachusetts Executive Council for the Seventh Councilor District.

Death
Stoddard died in Worcester, Massachusetts on September 27, 1903.

Notes

1827 births
Massachusetts lawyers
Massachusetts city council members
Mayors of Worcester, Massachusetts
Members of the Massachusetts House of Representatives
Massachusetts state senators
Members of the Massachusetts Governor's Council
Brown University alumni
1903 deaths
Members of the American Antiquarian Society
19th-century American politicians